James Stephen Rice (1846–1930) was an American businessman and rancher who was a pioneering resident of Orange County, California and a civic leader in Tustin, California.

Early life and education in Ohio
James Stephen Rice was born 31 October 1846 in Cleveland, Ohio to Harvey Rice (1800–1891) and Emma Maria (Fitch) Rice (1812–1889).  Rice was educated in the public schools in Cleveland and attended Case Western Reserve College in Hudson, Ohio, graduating with a BA degree in classical studies in 1866.  Rice married Coralinn Frances Barlow (1849–1919) of Cleveland on 2 October 1872, and they had four children.  From 1866 to 1877, he was in business with his half-brother Percival Wood Rice and his brother-in-law Proctor Rollin Burnett, who were proprietors of the Rice & Burnett Company a crockery and home furnishing business in Cleveland.

Life and career in California

James Stephen Rice and his family moved to Orange County, California on 18 January 1877, first residing near the head of Newport Bay in one of the former ranch houses owned by José Antonio Andres Sepúlveda (1803–1875), the owner of Rancho San Joaquin.  Rice began ranching by working for his brother-in-law James Irvine who had purchased the Rancho San Joaquin from Sepúlveda in 1864 and established the Irvine Ranch.

In 1878, Rice purchased a small tract of land from Peter Potts in the village of Tustin, shortly after Columbus Tustin laid out the first real estate plats, and he planted Valencia orange trees and Muscat grapes. In the California real estate boom of 1886–87, he sold off all but  of his land for development at $4000 per acre, allowing him to build a three-story home on his remaining property. Mrs. Coralinn Rice was a noted Orange County socialite frequently hosting performing artists including Helena Modjeska at their home in Tustin. Mrs. Coralinn Rice died in 1919.

Rice was active in politics in Orange County, serving as chairman of the Orange County Democratic Party Central Committee in the early 1920s.  Rice died on 15 April 1930 at his home in Tustin, and buried at Fairhaven Memorial Park in Santa Ana, California.

The Rice family relations and genealogy

James S. Rice's eldest son James Willis Rice, who was born 24 August 1873 in Cleveland, followed his father as a rancher and fruit grower in the Tustin, California area.  In about 1910 James W. Rice married Ruebel Martin, daughter of John Henry Martin, a Nevada state senator from Douglas County, Nevada, and they had two sons Harvey M. Rice (1913–1974), and James Willis Rice, Jr. (1916–1996).  James W. Rice, Sr. died in 1951 in Tustin.

James S. Rice's youngest son Percy Fitch Rice who was born 25 November 1882 was an accomplished inventor who patented several devices, including an automatic paper feeding device for printing presses ( 1903), an automatic transmission for automobiles ( 1913), the push-button radio tuner ( 1925), the gasoline gauge for the automobile ( 1930) and a multiple exposure camera ( 1947).  He lived in Orange County for most of his life, dying there on 25 May 1954.

Rice's sister, Henrietta Maria "Nettie" (Rice) Irvine (1841-1874) was married to James Irvine, a San Francisco merchant and founder of the Irvine Ranch in Orange County.  His brother-in-law (the brother of Coralinn), Charles Averill Barlow (1858–1927), lived in Bakersfield, California and was a U.S. Congressman from the Populist Party serving in California's 6th congressional district.

James S. Rice was a direct descendant of Edmund Rice, an English immigrant to Massachusetts Bay Colony, as follows:

 James Stephen Rice, son of
 Harvey Rice, (1800 – 1891), son of
 Stephen Rice (1769 – 1850) son of
 Cyrus Rice (1726 – 1804), son of
 Josiah Rice (1696 – 1730), son of 
 Ephraim Rice (1665 – 1732), son of
 Thomas Rice (1625 – 1681), son of
 Edmund Rice (1594 – 1663)

References

External links

Archival collections
Guide to the Rice Family Papers. Special Collections and Archives, The UC Irvine Libraries, Irvine, California.

Ranchers from California
American pioneers
1930 deaths
1846 births
Businesspeople from Cleveland
Case Western Reserve University alumni
People from Tustin, California
History of Orange County, California